Burlingame is a name for a couple of high schools in the United States, including:
 Burlingame High School (California)
 Burlingame High School (Kansas)